ASML may refer to:

 ASML Holding (formerly Advanced Semiconductor Materials Lithography), a Dutch company that supplies photolithography systems for the semiconductor industry
 Atlanta, Stone Mountain and Lithonia Railway (ASM&L; reporting mark ASML)
 Aisha Steel Mills Limited, a Pakistani steel manufacturing company
 Abstract State Machine Language, a programming language

See also